The fragmentary hypothesis may refer to:

 The fragmentary hypothesis of the Pentateuch as an alternative to the documentary hypothesis or supplementary hypothesis
 Multi-source hypothesis of the formation of the Synoptic Gospels